Alexarchus may refer to:

Alexarchus of Corinth, Greek general in the Peloponnesian War
Alexarchus of Macedon (c. 350–c. 290 BC), Macedonian scholar
Alexarchus (historian), Greek historian who wrote a work on the history of Italy

Greek masculine given names